The following is the qualification system and qualified countries for the Basque pelota at the 2023 Pan American Games competitions.

Qualification system
A total of 66 athletes (33 per gender) will qualify to compete. Each nation may enter a maximum of 12 athletes (six per gender). The host country (Chile) automatically qualified a full team of 12 athletes. There will be a total of two qualification events. The best ranked country of the Americas in each event of the Biarritz 2022 Absolute World Basque
Pelota Championship will secure a spot. The second event is the 2023 Pan American Basque Pelota Tournament, in which 21 men and 21 women will be qualified.

Qualification timeline

Qualification summary

Men

Doubles trinquete rubber ball

Individual fronton rubber ball

Doubles frontenis

Frontball

Women

Doubles trinquete rubber ball

Individual fronton rubber ball

Doubles frontenis

Frontball

References

B
Qualification for the 2023 Pan American Games
Basque pelota at the 2023 Pan American Games